English indie pop band Blossoms have released four studio albums, one compilation album and live album, four extended plays and twenty singles. Their debut studio album, Blossoms, was released in August 2016 and peaked at number one on the UK Albums Chart. The album includes the singles "Blow", "Cut Me and I'll Bleed", "Blown Rose", "Charlemagne", "At Most a Kiss", "Getaway", "My Favourite Room" and "Honey Sweet". Their second studio album, Cool Like You, was released in April 2018 and peaked at number four on the UK Albums Chart. The album includes the singles "I Can't Stand It", "There's a Reason Why (I Never Returned Your Calls)" and "How Long Will This Last?". Their third studio album, Foolish Loving Spaces, was released in January 2020. The album includes the singles "Your Girlfriend", "The Keeper" and "If You Think This Is Real Life". Their fourth studio album, Ribbon Around the Bomb, was released in April 2022. The album includes the singles "Care For", "Ribbon Around the Bomb", "Ode to NYC" and "The Sulking Poet".

Studio albums

Compilation and live albums

Extended plays

Singles

Notes

References

Discographies of British artists